Kutah Mehr (also Romanized as Kūtah Mehr) is a village in Benajuy-ye Gharbi Rural District, in the Central District of Bonab County, East Azerbaijan Province, Iran. At the 2006 census, its population was 338, in 81 families.

References 

Populated places in Bonab County